Rog-O-Matic is a bot developed in 1981 to play and win the video  game Rogue, by four graduate students in the Computer Science Department at Carnegie-Mellon University in Pittsburgh: Andrew Appel, Leonard Hamey, Guy Jacobson and Michael Loren Mauldin.

Described as a "belligerent expert system", Rog-O-Matic performs well when tested against expert Rogue players, even winning the game.

Because all information in Rogue is communicated to the player via ASCII text, Rog-O-Matic has automatic access to the same information a human player has. The program is still the subject of some scholarly interest; a 2005 paper said:

Notes

References

External links 
 
 

Game artificial intelligence
Expert systems